Launay Saturné (born 1964 in Petit-Goâve) is a Haitian clergyman and bishop. He was ordained in 1991. He was Bishop of Jacmel from 2010 until 2018 when he became  Archbishop of Cap-Haïtien.

References

External links 

Haitian Roman Catholic archbishops
People from Ouest (department)
Living people
1964 births
21st-century Roman Catholic archbishops in Haiti
Roman Catholic archbishops of Cap-Haïtien
Roman Catholic bishops of Jacmel